Egypt has long been the cultural and informational centre of the Middle East and North Africa, and Cairo is the region's largest publishing and broadcasting centre.

Telecommunication in Egypt

Press 
There are eight daily newspapers with a total circulation of more than 2 million, and a number of monthly newspapers, magazines, and journals. The majority of political parties have their own newspapers, and these papers conduct a lively, often highly partisan debate on public issues.

Mail 
Egypt Post is the government-owned body that provides postal services.

Radio 
See also Egyptian Radio and Television Union & List of radio stations in Egypt

Radio in Egypt is almost all government controlled, using 44 short-wave frequencies, 18 medium-wave stations, and four FM stations. There are seven regional radio stations covering the country. Egyptian Radio transmits 60 hours daily overseas in 33 languages and three hundred hours daily within Egypt. In 2000, Radio Cairo introduced new specialized (thematic) channels on its FM station. So far, they include news, music, and sports. Radio enjoys more freedom than TV in its news programs, talk shows and analysis. 

Starting 2003, Nile Radio Productions, a private company, was given license to operate two radio stations; Nile FM and Nogoum FM. Nile FM broadcasts in English and Nogoom FM broadcasts in Egyptian. Both stations mostly broadcast mainly to the Greater Cairo region. In the early 2009, Radio Masr was launched, broadcasting popular Egyptian songs, news & other programs.

Television 
See also Egyptian television
Egyptian ground-broadcast television (ERTU) is government controlled and depends heavily on commercial revenue. ETV sells its specially produced programs and soap operas to the entire Arab world. ETV has two main channels, six regional channels, and three satellite channels. Of the two main channels, Channel I uses mainly Arabic, while Channel II is dedicated to foreigners and more cultured viewers, broadcasting news in English and French as well as Arabic.

Egyptian Satellite channels broadcast to the Middle East, Europe, and the U.S. East Coast. In April 1998, Egypt launched its own satellite known as NileSat 101. Seven specialized channels cover news, culture, sports, education, entertainment, health, and drama. A second, digital satellite, Nilesat 102, was launched in August 2000. Many of its channels are rented to other stations.

Three new private satellite-based TV stations were launched in November 2001, marking a great change in Egyptian government policy. Dream TV 1 and 2 produce cultural programming, broadcast contemporary video clips and films featuring Arab and international actors, as well as soap operas; another private station focuses on business and general news. Both private channels transmit on NileSat.

In addition to Egyptian programming, the Middle East Broadcast Company, a Saudi television station transmitting from London (MBC), Arab Radio and Television (ART), Al-Jazeera television, and other Gulf stations as well as Western networks such as CNN and BBC, provide access to more international programs to Egyptians who own satellite receivers.

Landline telephony 
See also Telephone numbers in Egypt

Currently, there is a single company in charge of landline telephony, Telecom Egypt which is also government-controlled.

Cellular communications 
See also Telephone numbers in Egypt

Currently, there are four companies which offer cellular communication service: Orange, Vodafone, Etisalat, and We (by Telecom Egypt). These companies also provide services surpassing voice communication, such as 4G, 3G, and mobile internet.

Internet 

The Internet companies market is dealt to two: infrastructure providers and service providers.

 {NOOR Data Network}
 Telecom Egypt
 Orange DSL
 Etisalat Egypt
 Vodafone Egypt

There are 8 major Service Provider companies which sell their services to smaller ISPs. The highest available speed through ADSL technologies was upgraded to 8Mb in download in February 2008 and then to 24Mb later that year.
The Egyptian ISP market is not competitive, at least in Cairo and Alexandria, with only 3 ISPs offering below-average speeds(Up to 16Mbit/s).

Orascom, one of the shareholders in the leading cellular operator MobiNil, is also the biggest player in the Internet service provision market and owns 75 per cent of one of Egypt's largest ISP, LINKdotNET. The tie-up with the mobile operator is significant in that WAP services were introduced in May for a trial period, making Egypt one of the first countries in Africa to have introduced WAP.

NileOnline and Egynet has been recently sold to Etisalat, increasing Etisalat access into the broadband market. with this acquisition all class I tier ISPs mentioned above are owned by the major telecommunication companies operating in the country.

Raya is owned by Vodafone Egypt, Nileonline and Egynet are now owned by Etisalat, TEdata is owned and operated by the oldest telecom company in the region telecom Egypt and link.net is owned by Orascom telecom.

On January 27, 2011, almost all internet connectivity to Egypt was shut off by the Egyptian government.

Wireless Internet 
Egypt is following closely the efforts to standardize WiMax technologies as they permit simpler and faster access to Internet services, especially as WiMax receivers are integrated into PC processors.
The government is still also holding discussions with relevant stakeholders to determine the best policy framework for introducing WiMax into the market through existing or new operators.

Satellite

Communication companies in Egypt

Landline telephony service 
 Telecom Egypt

Cellular communication service 
 Orange
 Vodafone
 Etisalat
 Telecom Egypt
 WE

Statistics

Telephones 

 main lines in use: 10.808 million (2006)

Telephones 
 mobile cellular: 300.047 million (2007)

Telephone system 
 large system; underwent extensive upgrading during the 1990s and is reasonably modern; Telecom Egypt, the landline monopoly, has been increasing service availability and in 2006 fixed-line density stood at 14 per 100 persons; as of 2007 there were three mobile-cellular networks and service is expanding rapidly

domestic 
 principal centers at Alexandria, Cairo, Al Mansurah, Ismailia, Suez, and Tanta are connected by coaxial cable and microwave radio relay

International 
 landing point for both the SEA-ME-WE-3 AND SEA-ME-WE-4 submarine cable networks; linked to the international submarine cable FLAG (Fiber-Optic Link Around the Globe); satellite earth stations - 2 Intelsat (Atlantic Ocean and Indian Ocean), 1 Arabsat, and 1 Inmarsat; tropospheric scatter to Sudan; microwave radio relay to Israel; a participant in Medarabtel

Radio broadcast stations 
 AM 42 (plus 15 repeaters), FM 14, shortwave 3 (1999)

Radios 
3.07 million (1997)

Television Broadcast Stations 
 98 (1995)

Internet Service Providers (ISPs) 
 220 (2008)

Class A Data Service Providers in Egypt:

International Wholesale & Enterprise services:

1- NOOR Data Network.

2- TE Data (WE).

3- Vodafone Egypt.

4- Orange Egypt.

5- Etisalat Egypt.

Mobile-Data & consumer services:

1 - Orange. (4G/Broadband)

2 - WE (Broadband/PRI/Landline)

3- Vodafone. (4G/Broadband)

4- Etisalat. (4G/Broadband)

5- NOOR Telecommunications (Broadband, Premium-Broadband & mVPN).

Internet Hosts 
 5,363 (2007)

People connected to the internet 
 12,568,900(As of June 2009)
Country codes .EG (Top-level domain)

Telephone prefixes 
Country code: +2(0)

Mobile services:
 Orange : 012
 Vodafone: 010
 Etisalat: 011
 We (Telecom Egypt): 015

Governorate code: 
Cairo (Capital), Giza 2
(Includes following cities: Cairo, Giza, 6th Of October, Helwan, New Cairo)
Alexandria 3
Banha 13
10th of Ramadan 15
Tanta 40
Damanhour 45
Marsa Matrouh 46
Kafer El Sheik 47
Menouf 48
Mansoura 50
Zagazig 55
Damiette 57
Suez 62
Ismailia 64
Red Sea 65
Port Said 66
El Arish 68
El Tour 69
Bani Suef 82
Fayyoum 84
Minia 86
Assiout 88
El Wadi El Gedid 92
Sohag 93
Luxor 95
Qena 96
Aswan 97

See also 
 Media of Egypt
 Broadband internet in Egypt

References

External links
 Public domain text from State.gov
 List of Egyptian Newspapers and Magazines